32.6972° N, 71.9312° E

Lawa (Punjabi, Urdu: لاوا) is a city and the headquarters of Lawa Tehsil of Talagang District in the Punjab, Pakistan. 

Some of the notable neighboring villages include Danda Shah Bilawal, Chaki Sheikh Gee, and Changa.

References

Populated places in Talagang District